Rabindra Bharati Mahavidyalaya, established in 2010, is the government degree college in Purba Medinipur district. It offers humanities undergraduate courses in the arts. It is affiliated to Vidyasagar University.

Departments

Arts

Bengali
English
History
Education
Sanskrit
Sociology
Geography

See also

References

External links
Rabindra Bharati Mahavidyalaya

Colleges affiliated to Vidyasagar University
Educational institutions established in 2010
Universities and colleges in Purba Medinipur district
2010 establishments in West Bengal